The 2004–05 Algerian Championnat National was the 43rd season of the Algerian Championnat National since its establishment in 1962. A total of 16 teams contested the league, with JS Kabylie as the defending champions, The Championnat started on August 20, 2004. and ended on June 13, 2005.

Team summaries

Promotion and relegation 
Teams promoted from Algerian Division 2 2004–2005 
 Paradou AC
 CA Batna
 US Biskra

Teams relegated to Algerian Division 2 2005–2006
 OMR El Annasser
 GC Mascara
 US Chaouia

Results

League table

Result table

Season statistics

Top scorers

References

External links
2004–05 Algerian Championnat National

Algerian Championnat National
Championnat National
Algerian Ligue Professionnelle 1 seasons